The Andean solitaire (Myadestes ralloides) is a species of bird in the family Turdidae. It is found in Bolivia, Colombia, Ecuador, Peru, and Venezuela. Its natural habitats are subtropical or tropical moist montane forests and heavily degraded former forest.

References

Andean solitaire
Birds of the Andes
Birds of the Northern Andes
Andean solitaire
Taxonomy articles created by Polbot